Kallangur railway station is located on the Redcliffe Peninsula railway line in Queensland, Australia. It serves the suburb of Kallangur in the Moreton Bay Region opening on 4 October 2016. It is located between Goodfellows and Dohles Rocks Roads. The station is expected to generate a business centre in the immediate surrounding area.

Construction of the station was delayed after design problems in the nearby road-over-rail bridges were identified.

Services
Kallangur is served by trains operating from Kippa-Ring to Roma Street and Springfield Central. Some afternoon weekday services continue to Ipswich.

Services by platform

Transport links
Hornibrook Bus Lines operate three routes via Kallangur station:
683: to Dakabin
684: to North Lakes
685: to North Lakes

Thompsons Bus Service operates one route via Kallangur station:
676: Murrumba Downs to North Lakes

References

External links

Kallangur, Queensland
Railway stations in Moreton Bay Region
Railway stations in Australia opened in 2016